Sonakania is a Union of Satkania Upazila in the Division of Chittagong, Bangladesh. 

It has an area of 26.53 km2 and is bounded by Satkania Municipality on the north, Lohagara Upazila on the south, Satkania Union on the east, Madarsha Union on the west.

According to the 2011 Bangladesh Census, Sonakania Union has a population of 23,790.

References

Chittagong Division